John W. Wood (1884–1959) was an English association football player, referee and coach who was briefly head coach of the United States men's national soccer team. He was born in Nottingham, England. Upon emigrating to the US, Wood played for several teams on the east coast. He later became the soccer coach at Oak Park High School in Oak Park, Illinois.

Wood led the American team at the 1952 Summer Olympics, and was inducted into the National Soccer Hall of Fame that same year. Former head coach Walter Giesler served as manager for the 1952 squad. The team played one game at those games, losing a qualifier to Italy 8–0.

References

External links
National Soccer Hall of Fame biography
List of U.S. national team coaches
The historical society of Oak Park & River Forest – John W. Wood biography

1884 births
1959 deaths
English footballers
American soccer coaches
English expatriate footballers
English football managers
English football referees
National Soccer Hall of Fame members
Footballers from Nottingham
United States men's national soccer team managers
Association footballers not categorized by position
American Olympic coaches